The East Coast Group Representation Constituency is a five-member Group Representation Constituency in the eastern area of Singapore. The areas of the Group Representation Constituency consists of locations such as East Coast Park, Bedok, Changi, Simei, Siglap, Tampines, Pasir Ris, Chai Chee, Changi Airport. The GRC also covers a large portion of Singapore's eastern territorial waters. The five divisions: Bedok, Siglap, Fengshan, Changi-Simei and Kampong Chai Chee. The current MPs are from the People's Action Party (PAP) Heng Swee Keat, Maliki Osman, Tan Kiat How, Cheryl Chan and Jessica Tan.

History

East Coast GRC was formed in 1997 as a six-member Group Representation Constituency. East Coast GRC was formed with a merger of Bedok Group Representation Constituency and Eunos Group Representation Constituency. It was downsized from six members to five members following the redrawing of divisions into the Marine Parade GRC in 2006. 

Joo Chiat Single Member Constituency was formerly part of the GRC until 2001, and subsumed into Marine Parade GRC as of the 2015 elections. A large portion of the Kaki Bukit division and 60% of Kampong Chai Chee was transferred from East Coast GRC to Marine Parade GRC and saw the removal of Chew Heng Ching, Tan Soo Khoon and Lee Yock Suan due to the advanced age in 2006, followed by S Jayakumar and Abdullah Tarmugi in 2011. 

The offshore island of Coney Island was transferred to Pasir Ris–Punggol GRC in 2015, while Fengshan SMC was carved out and East Coast GRC was left with four members. East Coast GRC was increased in size to five after Fengshan SMC has been absorbed back into East Coast GRC for the 2020 general election.

The People's Action Party (PAP) won in a walkover in the 1997 and 2001 general elections. It saw its first contest in the 2006 general election from the Workers' Party. This GRC is a perennial battleground between the two parties. In 2011 and 2015, the People's Action Party received numerous close fights with the Worker's Party and won both times, though the results allowed Worker's Party candidates to enter parliament as Non-Constituency MPs both times.

In October 2015, Lee Yi Shyan stepped down from his ministerial post after suffering from a mini stroke in May 2015. Prior to the 2020 general election, Lee Yi Shyan and Lim Swee Say retired from politics. 

The resulting election saw the PAP retaining East Coast GRC, albeit with the second closest marginal result after West Coast GRC; Worker's Party candidates did not enter parliament as NCMPs this time as the offer was made to the Progress Singapore Party in West Coast GRC as the best performing losers.

Town Council

East Coast Town Council is operating under the East Coast GRC.

Members of Parliament

Electoral results

Elections in 1990s

Elections in 2000s

Elections in 2010s

Elections in 2020s

References

2020 General Election's result
2015 General Election's result
2011 General Election's result
2006 General Election's result
2001 General Election's result
1997 General Election's result
1991 General Election's result
1988 General Election's result

Singaporean electoral divisions
Bedok
Changi
Changi Bay
North-Eastern Islands
Pasir Ris
Tampines